Dissidocerida is an order of Early Ordovician to the Early Silurian orthoceratoid cephalopods in which the siphuncle has a continuous lining or a longitudinal rod-like structure within.

The order Dissidocerida was proposed by Zhuravleva (1994) for Dissidoceras undosum Zhuravleva, 1964, a Silurian orthoconic genus with a wide, nearly central, tubular siphuncle, suborthochoanitic septal necks, and endosiphuncular rod; in many aspects similar to rod-bearing orthocones of the Ordovician. It is thought by some that Ordovician-Silurian orthocones with continuous longitudinal endosiphuncular laminar deposits constitute a single phylogenetic stock.

The Dissidocerida as understood includes the Polymeridae, Rangeroceratidae, Troedssonellidae, and Dissidocertidae. The Polymeridae and  Rangeroceratidae were proposed by Evans in 2005  for Polymeres Murchison 1839 and Rangeroceras Hook and Flower 1977, respectively.  Troedssonellidae was established by Kobayashi in 1935 and is based on the genus Troedssonella.  The Dissidoceratidae was established by Zhuravleva for Dissidoceras undosum

References

 A. A. Shevyrev 2004, The Cephalopod Macrosystem: A Historical Review, the Present State of Knowledge, and 	Unsolved Problems: 2. Classification of Nautiloid Cephalopods.
 Bjorn Kroger, 2008. A new genus of middle Tremadocian orthoceratoids and the Early Ordovician origin of orthoceratoid cephalopods. Brief Report Acta Palaeontologica Polonica 53 (4): 745–749
 Paleobiology -Dissidocerida

Orthoceratoidea
Prehistoric cephalopod orders
Ordovician cephalopods
Silurian cephalopods
Ordovician first appearances
Silurian extinctions